Kerala Congress (B) is a registered-unrecognized political party in Kerala, formed by R. Balakrishna Pillai, a former minister of the government of Kerala. At present, the party has one MLA in the state Legislative Assembly, namely K. B. Ganesh Kumar, a well-known film actor and son of R. Balakrishna Pillai, who has been representing the Pathanapuram constituency in Kollam District since 2001. The KC(B) was a constituent of UDF until 2014 and is now part of LDF. Ganesh Kumar served as a minister (portfolio in Forest, Sports and Cinema) in the UDF government beginning 18 May 2011 until his resignation on 2 April 2013.

History 
The party was formed in 1977, following the split in Kerala Congress that occurred after the death of K. M. George due to differences that arose between K. M. Mani and R. Balakrishna Pillai. The party was a constituent of Left Democratic Front on formation. Later it moved to the congress led United Democratic Front (Kerala) and became a part of the Third Karunakaran ministry. The party chief R. Balakrishna Pillai was the minister of Transport in that ministry. During this period Pillai's home turf Kottarakkara got developed as a major Kerala State Road Transport Corporation hub of the state.

In 1985, the Mani, Joseph and Pillai led KC (B) merged to form Kerala Congress. In 1987, Mani broke away from this merger and left the coalition government. However Pillai stayed with Joseph till 1989 and the KC (B) was revived again in 1989. In 1995, Joseph M. Puthussery faction split and parted ways with Kerala Congress (B).

In 2015, KC (B) joined LDF by leaving the UDF.

On 3 May 2021, R. Balakrishna Pillai passes away due to age-related ailments. From 2017 onwards, he had been serving as the chairman of the Kerala State Welfare Corporation for Forward Communities, with cabinet rank. After Pillai's death, the State committee elected K. B. Ganesh Kumar as party chairman on 10 May 2021.

Performance in elections 
The party chief, R. Balakrishna Pillai was elected to the Lok Sabha in 1971 and the State Assembly nine times since 1960 (1965, 1977, 1980, 1982, 1987, 1991,1996, 2001). However, in the 2006 election he was defeated by a little-known opponent belonging to the Communist Party of India (Marxist).

His son K. B. Ganesh Kumar, a Malayalam film and television actor, made his electoral debut in 2001, when he was elected from Pathanapuram (State Assembly constituency). It was the election that the KC(B) reached its highest tally of 2 members in the Kerala Legislative Assembly. Ganesh went on to become Transport Minister in the Third Antony ministry. In a brief period of 2 years as minister he earned wide popularity for giving face-lift to the loss making Kerala State Road Transport Corporation. In 2003 Ganesh resigned and Pillai became the minister. Ganesh  is currently the Acting Chairman of the Kerala Congress (B).

Ganesh won the 2011 Kerala Legislative Assembly election and was the Minister for Forest, Sports, and Cinema in the second Oommen Chandy Ministry from 2011 to 2013. He had to resign following complaints from his wife regarding domestic violence. The Party  fielded  two candidates in the 2011 election to the Kerala Assembly. N. N. Murali, a well known surgeon, is the party's candidate from Kottarakkara. Ganesh Kumar achieved a hat-trick win from the Pathanapuram constituency. But Murali was defeated by his relative and LDF candidate P. Aisha Potty and only Ganesh Kumar could become MLA.

In 2015, the party left UDF and joined LDF. Ganesh Kumar again contested from Pathanapuram in the 2016 Kerala Legislative Assembly election, and won for a fourth consecutive time, this time defeating another famous film actor Jagadish by a huge margin. Pathanapuram constituency got statewide attention in those elections as the three major contestants from the constituency were all film actors – Ganesh Kumar (KC (B), Jagadish (INC) and Bheeman Raghu (BJP).

In the 2021 Kerala Legislative Assembly election the party is contesting from only one seat under the Left Democratic Front, in the Pathanapuram (State Assembly constituency) with K. B. Ganesh Kumar as the candidate.

Splinter group

After party founder and chairman R. Balakrishna Pillai's demise, a faction of the party led by Pillai's daughter Usha Mohandas, former MLA M. V. Mani and presidents of the party from 10 districts calls for the State committee meeting on 21 December 2021 and unanimously elected Usha Mohandas as party chairperson and M. V. Mani as working chairman.

References

Kerala Congress Parties
Political parties in Kerala
1977 establishments in Kerala
Political parties established in 1977